Roland Barbay (born October 1, 1964) is a former American football tackle. He played for the Seattle Seahawks in 1987.

References

1964 births
Living people
American football tackles
LSU Tigers football players
Seattle Seahawks players
Holy Cross High School, New Orleans alumni